List of railway stations in Myanmar.

Maps 
 UNHCR Atlas Map - shows Topography
 UN Map Myanmar - shows Provinces
 Geography of Myanmar

Division 1 Myitkyina

Mileage: 169.25 Miles 
Railroad Track: 199.90 Miles 
Bridges: 438 
Station: 33
(1) Myitkyina  722 3/4 miles from Yangon
(2) Nam Koi 715/0 Spur Line to Nampon Airport
(3) Pyi htaung 710 3/4
(4) Malika -
(5) Nam Hkam 701
(6) Mayam 698 1/4
(7) Nanmati 692 Spur Line to Sugar Mill
(8) Mogaung  686
(9) Hto Pu 680 3/4
(10) Sar Hmaw 675 1/4 Spur Line to Sugar Mill
(11) Taung Ni 670
(12) Min Gon 667 1/4
(13) Pinbaw 661 1/4
(14) Nam Khwin 657 1/2
(15) Kya Gyi Kwin 655 1/2
(16) Hopin 651 3/4
(17) Ta Kwin 649.5
(18) Myo Thit Ka Lay 647 1/4
(19) Namma 641 3/4
(20) Nyaung Kone 637 1/4
(21) Mohnyin  633 3/4
(22) Kadu 628
(23) Maw Han 618
(24) Nam Si Aung 611 3/4
(25) Maw Lu 606
(26) Pin Wei 597
(27) Naba (Junction) 590 Branch Line to Katha 605
(28) Indaw 585 3/4
(29) Se Ywa 581 3/4
(30) Me Zar 575 3/4
Me Zar River Bridge  574/ 20 

Bon Chaung 566 1/2 (Division 2)
Naba-Katha Line
(27) Naba (Junction) 590
(31) Lan Gwa 599 1/4
(32) Nat Yae Twin -
(33) Katha  605

Division 2 Ywa-Htaung

Mileague: 338.66 Miles 
Railroad Track: 379.82 Miles 
Bridges: 825 
Stations: 75
Me Zar 575 3/4 (from Division 1)
 
(1) Bon Chaung 566 1/2
(2) Nan Khan 559 1/4
(3) Gyo Daung 552
(4) Kin 547
(5) Wun Tho 543 3/4
(6) Win Gyi Pin 540 3/4
(7) Kawlin 535 3/4
(8) Kya Khat Aing 530
(9) Koe Taung Boet 527 1/2
(10) Sin Gaung 521 1/2
(11) Pauk Sein Kone 520 1/2
(12) Kan Gyi 519 1/4
(13) Chat Thin 516 1/4
(14) Chet Gyi 511 3/4
(15) Pin Tha 506 1/2
(16) Kyunhla 498 3/4
(17) Kanbalu 490 1/4
(18) Nyaung Pin 484 3/4
(19) Htan Kan 480 3/4
(20) Nyaung Zin 475 /16
(21) Thaya Kone 474 /4
(22) Htan Ta Pin 469 3/4
(23) Ma Daung Lu 464 1/4
(24) Khin-U  458 1/4 (Junction) To Ye-U
(25) Myin Ka Tha 450 3/4
(26) Shwebo 444 1/2
(27) Hput Hlaing -
(28) Moke Soe Chon 435 3/4
(29) Kyee Pin Kan -
(30) Tha Khut Taw 430
(31) Wetlet  428 1/4
(32) Tha Hlaing-Yone Tha 423/17
(33) Pauk Kan 418
(34) Htan Gyi -
(35) Khet Kha 411 3/4
(36) Padu 407 3/4
(37) Kan Gyi Kone 404
(38) Kyauk Pa Nan 403/5
(39) Sa Ye 400 1/4
(40) Ywa-Htaung  394 (Junction) To Chaung-U
(41) Sagaing 392 Spur Line to (42) Sagaing Port 391/12
Sagaing Bridge  390/20 To Mandalay (Division 3)
 
(40) Ywa-Htaung  394 (Junction)
(43) Nga Ta Yaw 404 1/4
(44) Ywa Thit Gyi 407 1/2
(45) Nyaung Pin Wun 414 1/2
(46) Myinmu 421 1/2
(47) Alakatpa 427 3/4
(48) Nat Yae Kan 435
(49) Chaung-U  441 3/4 (Junction) To Pakokku
(50) Kyeh Mon 448 1/2
(51) Than Bo Dwe Mo Nyin 450 3/4
(52) Monywa  459 3/4
(53) Za Loke 464 1/2
(54) Kan Swei 470
(55) Son Kone 474 1/2
(56) Budalin 479
(57) Nga Pu Yin -
(58) Sin Yan -
(59) Se Gyi -
(60) Kan Pya -
(61) On Din -
(62) In Daing Ga Lay -
(63) Tin Tein Yan -
(64) Chan Tha -
(65) Za Wa -
(66) Ye-U -
Mu River Bridge
(67) In Bat -
(68) Tha Ga Ya Myo Thit -
(69) Myit Taw -
(70) Kan Thar Yar Lay -
(24) Khin-U  458 1/4 (Junction)
 
(49) Chaung-U  441 3/4 (Junction)
(71) Hman Cho 445
(72) Nga Lone Tin 448
(73) Ma Gyi Gwa 451
(74) Ma Gyi Boke 453 3/4
(75)Taw Kyaung Gyi 454 3/4
Chindwin River Bridge (Sin Phyu Shin Bridge)

 Min Ywa, Ma Au (Division 10 Pakokku)

Division 3 Mandalay

Mileage: 376.95 Miles 
Railroad Track: 461.47 Miles 
Bridges: 1386 
Stations: 93
Sagaing Bridge  390/20 (from Division 2 Ywa-Htaung)

(1) Shwe Kyet Yet 388
(2) Ya Ta Na Gu 387
(3) Amarapura 386
(4) Myo Haung  382 3/4 (Junction to Lashio)

(5) Shanzu 389
(6) Mandalay 390 1/2
 
Yangon-Mandalay Line
(6) Mandalay 390 1/2
(5) Shanzu 389
(4) Myohaung  382 3/4 (Junction to Lashio)
(7) Ta Gun Daing 380 1/2
(8) Myitnge 377 1/4
(9) Paleik 374 1/4 (444) (Junction to Myingyan)
(10) Sintgaing 369
(11) Be Lin 363 1/2
(12) Kyaukse 359 1/4
(13) Minsu 352 1/2
(14) Myittha 347
(15) Ku Me Lan 341 1/2
(16) Tha Pyay Taung 336 1/4
(17) Odokkon 332 1/4
(18) Sa Mun 329
(19) Khin Ban 325 3/4
(20) The Daw 322 1/4
(21) Da Hat Taw 318 1/4
(22) Han Za 315 1/2
(23) Ywa Pale 310 1/2
 309/9 to Thazi 306 (Division 4)

Lashio Line
(4) Myo Haung 382 3/4
(24) Thoe Gyan  385 1/4 (Junction) to Tha Ye Ze
(25) Tonbo 392 3/4 Spur Line to the quarry
(26) Sedaw 396 1/4 Spur Line to the quarry
(27) Sa Tu Ta Lun Hto 400 1/4 Zig Zag railway
(28) Zi Pin Gyi 405
(29) Thondaung 411
(30) Anisakan 415
(31) Pyin U Lwin 422 1/2
(32) Pwe Kaul 427 3/4
(33) Wet Wun 433 1/2
(34) Sin Lan Su 438 1/4
(35) Hsam Ma Hse 444
(36) Nawnghkio 456
(37) Gokteik 463  Gokteik Viaduct
(38) Nawngpeng 472 1/4
(39) Sa Khan Tha 482
(40) Kyaukme 490
(41) Loi Hkaw 496
(42) Taw Gyi 504
(43) Hsipaw 509 1/2
(44) Ta Hpa Le 521
(45) Sun Lon -
(46) Se-eng 529 1/4
(47) Man Sam Ye Da Gun (Man Sam Waterfall) 537 1/4
(48) Man Pwe 543
(49) Thi Ri Shan Hkai 545 1/4
(50) Nam-yau 547 3/4 (Junction) to Namtu Mine Railway
(51) Lashio 560 3/4

Connection to China proposed 
 Namyao
 Kutkai
Muse 
 border  
 Ruili 
 under construction
 Baoshan
 Dali (junction with Chinese Railways)

Myingyan Line
(9) Paleik 444 (374 1/4) (Junction)
(52) La Tha -
(53) Tha Bet Hswe -
(54) Tada-U 436/5 Branch Line to (55) Tada-U Airport -
(56) Thu Nge Daw -
(57) Pyu Kan 431/2
(58) Myin Thei 430/7
(59) Sa Ka Tha -
(60) Kan Gyi 428/15
(61) Ta Naung Gaing -
(62)Pyi Tha Ya (Gwaykone)424/3
(63) Ywa Thit 421/8
(64) Myo Tha 417/16
(65) Aung Chan Tha -
(66) Su Hpyu Kone 409/75
(67) Wet Lu 405/19
(68) Daung U -
(69) Hnget Pyaw Aing -
(70) Tha Min Be -
(71) Natogyi 394/11
(72) Shaw Byu 390/1
(73) Pin Ywa Lay -
(74) Ywa Gyi 385/8
(75) Nyaung Pin Tha -
(76) San Bya -
376/12 to Myingyan 375/18 (Division 11)

Tha Ye Ze Line
(24) Thoe Gyan 385 1/4 (Junction)
(77) Kanthaya 386
(78) Aung Pin Le 387 1/4
(79) Yin Pyan 388 3/4
(80) Nanshe 389 1/2
(81) Dawna Bwar 391 1/4
(82) Nwe Ni 393
(83) Oh Bo 389 (Junction)
(84) Tha Ye Ze 387

Madaya Line
(83) Oh Bo 389 (Junction)
(85) Mya Na Nwa 391 1/2
(86) Ka Baing 392
(87) Taung Pyone 394
(88) Lun Taung 395 3/4
(89) Kyon Ywa -
(90) Kan Beit 397 3/4
(91) Wa Yin Dauk 399 1/4
(92) Ale Bon -
(93) Madaya 402 1/2

Division 4 Kalaw

Mileague: 465.33 Miles 
Railroad Track: 572.73 Miles 
Bridges: 1406 
Stations: 115 (Only 102 Stations shown on map)
Kalaw-Thazi Line
(1) Kalaw 369
(2) Myin Daik 361
(3) Hsin Taung 357 1/4
(4) Khway Yok 352
(5) Pa Ta Ma Lun Hto 347
(6) Le Byin 343 3/4
(7) Ye Bu 341 1/2
(8) Pyi Nyaung 334 3/4
(9) Yin Ma Pin 329
(10) Pa Ya Nga Zu 319 1/4  Spur Line to the quarry
(11) Hlaing Tet 314 3/4
(12) Thazi 306 (Junction) to Mandalay and Pyinmana
(13) Kun Chan Yi 309 1/2
(14) Kyaik Pu Le 313 1/4
(15) Taw Ma 316 3/4

 Meiktila 320 Continued to Myingyan (Division 11)

Yangon-Mandalay Line
 Ywa Pa Le 310 1/2 (Division 3)
(12) Thazi 306
(16) Nwa Do 302 1/4
(17) Nyaung Yan 299 1/4
295/14

Shan Ywa 292 3/4 Continued to Pyinmana (Division 5)

Loikaw Line
(1) Kalaw 369
(18) Aungpan 376 (Junction) to Lawksawk, Moene
(19) Nan On 380
(20) In Wun 384 1/2
(21) Baw Nin Gon 389
(22) Nan Taing 391 1/2
(23) Chaung Pwet -
(24) Ton 397
(25) Nawng Mun -
(26) Hti Ji 398 1/2
(27) Hle Gon -
(28) Bu Ya Me 400
(29) Ta Te 404
(30) Naungtayar 410 1/2
(31) Nye Pin 412 1/4
(32) Ta Ku Myo 413 1/2
(33) Hti Yun 415
(34) Thit Pin Gyi 416 3/4
(35) Saung Hsi 418
(36) Pin Laung Ze -
(37) Pinlaung 424 1/2
(38) Wa Lee 428 1/2
(39) Pin Hkun 430 3/4
(40) Nan Hta -
(41) Hsaung Pyaung 439 3/4
(42) Ka Ya  445 1/2
(43) Me Za Lan 448 1/4
(44) Ka The 453
(45) Pe Kon 455 3/4
(46) Hkaung Mong 463 1/2
(47) Mong Pya 467 1/2
(48) Wa Li Su Pa Laing -
(49) Wi The Ku 470
(50) Nan Me Hkun 473 1/4
(51) Loikaw 478

Kalaw-Lawksawk Line
(1) Kalaw 369
(18) Aungpan 376 (Junction) to Loikaw 478
(52) Kan Na 384 3/4
(53) He Ho 392 3/4 Spiral railroad
(54) Shwe Nyaung 404 (Junction) to Moene
(55) He Ke 407 1/4
(56) Taung Ni 410 1/2
(57) Yae Pu -
(58) Kwin Lon 418 3/4
(59) Ban Kan -
(60) Htee Hkan 422 3/4
(61) Pin Hpyit 426 1/4
(62) Yadana Pon 430 1/4
(63) Nyaung Htan Pin -
(64) Yae Hpyu 435 1/4
(65) Lawksawk (Yat Sauk) 441 1/2

Shwe Nyaung-Taunggyi-Nansan-Mong Nai Line
(54) Shwe Nyaung 404 (Junction) to Lawksauk 441 1/2
(66) Aye Tha Ya 408 3/4
(67) Paw Mu 413 1/2
(68) Hti Thin -
(69) Ye Twe-U -
(70) Taunggyi 424 1/2
(71) Hpa Mun -
(72) Naung Kar -
(73) Hang Si -
(74) Kek Ku -
(75) Naung Ae -
(76) Ban Yin 459 3/4
(77) Loi Hsan Sit -
(78) Hsaik Hkaung -
(79) Loi Pu -
(80) Kaung Ke -
(81) Pyin Tha Ya -
(82) Mi Ye -
(83) Thi Yi -
(84) Pwin Chaung -
(85) Pu Ya Sin -
(86) Thi Pin -
(87) Nam Hu -
(88) Kaung Maing -
(89) Naung Mo -
(90) Hwe Hse -
(91) Maing Sit -
(92) Haing Na Nge La -
(93) Ma Lan Hkam -
(94) Ah Hma 5 Ywa -
(95) Nansang -
(96) Ah Hma 6 Ywa -
(97) Nan Kyu -
(98) Haik Hpa -
(99) Wan Ye -
(100) Pang Au -
(101) Na Hkan -
(102) Mong Nai (Moene) -

Division 5 Taungoo

Mileague: 174.75 Miles 
Railroad Track: 289.80 Miles 
Bridges: 593 
Stations: 41 (Now 42; Nay Pyi Taw included)
Nyaung Yan 295/14 (Division 3)

Yangon-Mandalay Line
(1) Shan Ywa 292 3/4
(2) Pyawbwe 287 1/2
(3) Shwe Da 282 1/2
(4) In Gyin Kan 278 1/2
(5) Yamethin 274 1/2
(6) Inn Gon 270 3/4
(7) Hnge Taik 268
(8) Nyaung Lunt 261 1/2
(9) Ma Gyi Bin 257 1/2
(10) Tatkon 253 1/2
(11) Sin The 251
(12) Shwe Myo 246 3/4
(13) Sin Byu Gyun 243 1/2
(14) Pyok Kwe 240 1/2
(15) Kyihtaunggan 235 1/4
(16) Nay Pyi Taw 233/0 Inaugurated on 5 July 2009
(17) Ywataw 230
(18) Pyinmana 225 (Junction) to Taungdwingyi
(19) Pyi Win 219 1/4
(20) Ela 216 3/4
(21) Htein-In 214
(22) Tha Wat Ti 210
(23) Yae Ni 206 1/2
(24) Myo Hla 201 1/4
(25) Tha Yet Kone 197/23-24
(26) Thar Ga Ya 195 1/2
(27) Swar 191 1/2
(28) Kone Gyi 187 1/4
(29) Ye Da She 183 1/4
(30) Kay Tu Ma Ti 180 1/2
(31) Kyun Kone 175 1/2
(32) Kyee Taw 171 1/2
(33) Taungoo 166
163/24
 
Thaung Taing Kone 161 3/4 (Division 6)

Pyinmana-Taungdwingyi Line
(18) Pyinmana 225 (Junction)
(34) Pyu Twin 229 1/4
(35) Baw Ti Gon 232 3/4
(36) Le We 235 3/4
(37) Chaung Kyoe -
(38) Kan Thar 241 1/4
(39) Win Te Gu 243 1/4
(40) Thit Poke Pin 247 3/4
(41) Min Pyin 252 1/2
(42) Da Lant Chun 261 1/2
263/11

Oh Bauk 266 3/4 (Division 11)

Division 6 Yangon Division

Mileage 327.86 Miles 
Railway 529.75 Track Miles 
Bridges 994 Bridges 
Stations 91 Stations
Dar Pein 22 1/2 (junction to Hlehlaw-In 44) (Division 7)

Yangon-Mandalay Line
(1) Kawt Che 27
(2) Htone Gyi 30 1/4
(3) Kyauk Tan 34/1
(4) Tar Wa 38 1/4
(5) Payathonzu 42 1/2
(6) Pegu (Bago) 46 1/2 (Junction to Mawlamyine and Spur Line to (36) Hanthawaddy Airport (Project suspended))
(7) Shwe Hlay 51 3/4
(8) Shwe Tan 53 1/2
(9) Hpa Ya Gyi 57
(10) Hpa Ya Ka Lay 59 1/4
(11) Wan Be Inn -
(12) Pyin Pon 64 3/4
(13) Kyaik Sa Kaw 68
(14) Ka Toke 71
(15) Phaung Daw The 75 3/4
(16) Daik-U 81 1/4
(17) Pyun Ta Sa 87 3/4
(18) Nga Dat Kyi 90 1/4
(19) Nyaung Le Bin 92 3/4 (Junction to Madauk 109)
(20) Taw Wi 97 1/2
(21) Pein Za Loke 100 3/4
(22) Thu Htay Kone 106
(23) Kyauk Ta Ka 108 3/4
(24) Yin Taik Kone 111 1/2
(25) Pe Nwe Gon 114 1/4
(26) Taw Kywe Inn 119
(27) Ka Nyut Kwin 123 3/4
(28) Nyaung Pin Thar 128 1/2
(29) Phyu 134 1/4
(30) Zay Ya Wa Di 138 1/4
(31) Nyaung Chay Htauk 143 1/4
(32) Kywe Pwe 149 1/4
(33) Bant Bway Kone 152 3/4
(34) Ok Twin 158 1/4
(35) Thaung Taing Kone 161 3/4
163/24

Taungoo 166 (Division 5)

Nyaung Le Bin - Madauk Branch Line 
(19) Nyaung Le Bin 92 3/4
(37) Pu Zun Myaung 96 3/4
(38) Inn Waing 100 1/2
(39) Sa Hkan Tha -
(40) Madauk 109

Bago-Sittaung River Bridge Line
(6) Pegu(Bago) 46 1/2
(41) Ka Lay 49 1/4
(42) Shan Ywar Gyi 52 1/2
(43) Naung Pat Ta Yar 56 1/2
(44) Kyaik Hla 59 1/2
(45) Waw 63 1/2
(46) Ka Thi Win -
(47) Ah Byar 70 1/2 (Branch Line to (49) Nyaung Ka She 76/6 )
(48) Sat Thwar Chon 73 3/4Sittaung River Bridge 77/19 ( to Division 8)

Oak Kan 56 1/2 (Division 7)
 
Yangon-Pyay LineBago Region 60/12
(50) Nga Hpyu Ka Lay 61 1/2
(51) Thonze 65 3/4
(52) Thonze Myoma 66 1/4
(53) Thayarwady 68 3/4
(54) Inn Ywar 73
(55) Chin Thayt Kone 74 3/4
(56) Letpadan 77 1/4 (Junction to Tharawaw 100 3/4)
(57) Wet Hla Ka Lay 81 1/2
(58) Wet Hla Ka Lay Ywar Ma 83
(59) Sit Kwin 85
(60) Sin Aing 88 3/4
(61) Minhla 91 1/4
(62) Oe Thei Kone 95 1/2
(63) Okpho Ma Gyi Pin 99
(64) Okpho 101 1/2
(65) Thin Pan Kone 104
(66) Gyobingauk 109
(67) Hkunhni Ywa 111 1/2
(68) Zigon 116
(69) Nattalin 124
(70) Paungde 129 1/2
(71) Taung Boet Hla 133
(72) Launt Gyi 133 1/4
(73) Pu Tee Kone 136
(74) Thea Kyaw 138
(75) Thegon 141 1/4
(76) Oe Tin Kone 144 1/2
(77) Sin Mi Zwe 149 1/4
(78) Ywa Tha Gon 152 1/4
(79) Hmaw Za 155 3/4 (Junction to Aunglan-Taungdwingyi and Nay Pyi Taw)
(80) Ngagattaya 158 1/4
(81) Pyay 161

Pyay-Aunglan Line
(78) Hmaw Za 155 3/4 (Junction to Pyay)
(82) Shwe Ti Hka 157 /21
(83) Ti Tut 164/0Magway Region 175/12 (Division 11)

Letpadan-Tharawaw Branch Line 
(56) Letpadan 77 1/4
(84) Nyaung Waing 81 3/4
(85) Kyauk Aing 84 1/2
(86) Kha Mon Seik 87
(87) Than Byu Yon 94
(88) Ka Nyin To 94 3/4
(89) Zee Hpyu Kone 95 1/2
(90) Zee Hpyu Kone Ywa Mar 96 3/4
(91) Tharawaw 100 3/4 <--Ferry--> Hinthada 109 1/2 (Division 9)

Division 7 Yangon (Central)

Mileage 155.80 Miles 
Rail Track 312.14 Miles 
Bridges 448 Bridges 
Stations 75 Stations

Yangon Circular Rail Line 
38 Stations 
29 1/2 Miles
(1) Yangon 0/0
(2) Hpaya Lan (Pagoda Road) 3/4
(3) Lan Ma Daw 1
(4) Pyay Lan (Pyay Road) 1 1/2
(5) Shan Lan (Shan Road) 2
(6) Ah Lone Lan (Ahlone Road) 2 1/2
(7) Pan Hlaing Lan (Pan Hlaing Road) 3
(8) Kye Maing Daing (Kemmendine) 3 1/2
(9) Hanthawaddy 4 1/2
(10) Hletaw 4 3/4
(11) Kamayut 5 3/4
(12) Thi Ri Myaing 6 3/4
(13) Ok Kyin 7
(14) Tha Maing 7 1/4
(15) Tha Maing Myo Thit 7 3/4
(16) Gyo Gon 8 1/4
(17) Insein 9
(18) Ywa Ma 10 1/4
(19) Hpaw Kan 11
(20) Aung San Myo 11 1/2
(21) Da Nyin Gon 12 3/4 (Junction to Pyay)(22) Gaw Gwin (Golf Course) 13 1/2
(23) Kyaik Ka Le 15 1/4
(24) Min Ga La Don Zei (Mingaladon Bazaar) 17
(25) Min Ga La Don 17 1/2
(26) We Ba Gee 18 1/2
(27) Ok Ka La Pa 19 1/2
(28) Pa Ywet Seik Kon 20
(29) Kyauk Ye Dwin 20 3/4
(30) Ta Da Ka Le 21 1/2
(31) Ye Gu 22 1/2
(32) Par Ya Mee 23 1/4
(33) Kan Be 24
(34) Bauk Taw 25
(35) Ta Mwe 25 3/4
(36) Myit Ta Na Yunt 26 1/2
(37) Mah Lwa Gon 27 1/4
(38) Pa Zun Daung 28 1/2
(1) Yangon 29 1/2

Yangon-Mandalay Line
(1) Yangon 0/0
(39) Hnin Si Kone 4
(40) Thin Gan Gyun 4 1/2
(41) Nga Moe Yeik 5 1/4
(42) Togyaunggalay 7 1/4 (Junction to Thilwa and Dagon University)
(43) Ywar Thar Gyi 12 3/4
(44) Lay Daunt Kan 16
(45) Dar Pein 22 1/2 (Branch Line to Hlehlaw-In 44)
26/12

Htone Gyi 30 1/4 (Division 6)

Dagon University Line (4.96 miles, opened in 2006) 
(42) Togyaunggalay 7 1/4
(46) Dagon University 12.21

Thilwa Port Line (Syriam) 
(42) Togyaunggalay 7 1/4
(47) Industrial Estate (Zone 1) 9Thanlyin Bridge(48) Aung Thu Kha 13/11
(49) Oak Po Su 14/13  Branch Line to (52) University of East Yangon (opened in 2006)(50) Ja Ma -
(51) Thilwa -

Hlehlaw-In Line 
(45) Dar Pein 22 1/2
(53) Yee Lay 25 1/2
(54) In Taing 30 1/2
(55) Ye Mwan 35 1/2
(56) Ma Daw Pin 38
(57) Ye Twin -
(58) Sa Pu Taung -
(59) Na Pa Htun -
(60) Hlehlaw-In 44

Yangon-Pyay Line
(21) Da Nyin Gon 12 3/4 (Junction for Yangon Circular Rail Line)
(61) Industrial Zone (Sehmu Zone) 13 1/2
(62) Shwe Pyi Tha 14 1/4
(63) Tha Du Kan 15 1/4
(64) Hlaw Ga 17 1/2 (Spur Line to Computer University)
(65) Mo Gyoe Pyit 20 3/4
(66) Hmaw Bi 24 3/4
(67) Auk Wa Net Chaung 27 3/4
(68) Wa Net Chaung 29 3/4
(69) Let Pa Dan Su 32 3/4
(70) Phu Gyi 35 1/2
(71) Pa Tauk Tan 38 1/4
(72) Taik Kyi 41 1/2
(73) Tha Nat Chaung 46 1/2
(74) Pa Lon 51 1/2
(75) Oak Kan 56 1/2Bago Region 60/12

Nga Hpyu Ka Lay 61 1/4 (Division 6)

Division 8 Mawlamyine

Mileage 324.25 miles
Railway Track 386.75 miles
Bridges 832
Stations 82 (only 72 shown on the map)
Sat Thwar Chon 73 3/4 (Division 6)

Yangon-Bago-Mawlamyine-Ye-Dawei LineSittaung River Bridge 77/19
(1) Thein Za Yat 78 3/4
(2) Tha Hton Su 82
(3) Moke Pa Lin 84 1/2
(4) Sut Pa Nu 88
(5) Kyaik Ka Tha 90 1/2
(6) Bo Yar Gyi 95
(7) Kyaikto 98 3/4
(8) Ma Yan Kone 104
(9) Taung Sun 105 1/2
(10) Ah Naing Pun 113 3/4
(11) Hnin Pale 116 3/4 --> Spur Line to Phaya Kwin (abandoned ?) and Bilin Sugar mill
(12) Don Wun 121 1/2
(13) Thein Seik 126 3/4
(14) Naung Bo 129 1/4
(15) Naung Ku Lar 133 1/4
(16) Thaton 138 (Junction to Myaing Ka Lay, Hpa-An)(17) Aung Saing 141 3/4
(18) Yin Nyein 146 1/2
(19) Ka Tun 150 3/4
(20) Zin Kyaik 154 1/4
(21) Paung 159
(22) Kyway Gyan 161 3/4
(23) Moke Ta Ma 172 3/4Thanlwin River Bridge (Mawlamyaing Bridge)(24) Mawlamyaing (Old Station) 178
(25) Mawlamyaing 182 1/4
(26) Kawt Kha Ni 185 3/4
(27) Hpar Auk 189
(28) Hmein Ga Nein 194
(29) Mudon 197 1/2
(30) Taw Ku 202 1/2
(31) Ka Mar Wet 206
(32) Ka Lawt Thawt 209
(33) Kun Hlar 213 1/2
(34) Thanbyuzayat 217 1/4 (Junction to Payathonzu)(35) Pa Nga 223 1/4
(36) Ka Yoke Pi 226
(37) An Khe 229 1/2
(38) Htin Shu 233 1/2
(39) Ah Nin 239 1/2	
(40) Hnit Kayin 246
(41) Lamaing 252
(42) Taung Bon 258
(43) Paing Wan 261 1/4	
(44) Pa Yan Maw -
(45) Pa Laing Kee 266 1/4
(46) Ye 271 1/2Ye River Bridge(47) Chaung Taung 272/11 (with very small ? Ø 20 feet turntable)
(48) Kalawt Kyi -
(49) Koe Maing 279/19
(50) Pauk Pin Kwin 288/5
(51) Nat Kyi Zin 296/23
(52) Sein Bon 299.62
(53) Yae Ngan Gyi 301.77
(54) Sin Swei 303.17
(55) Min Tha 308/22
(56) Hsin Ku 309.70
(57) Ein Da Ra Za 318/22
(58) Gan Gaw Taung 320
(59) In Hpya -
(60) Kalein-Aung 333/0
(61) Yae Pone -
(62) Hein Ze 341/20
(63) Tha Ke Kwa 350/6
(64) Dauk Lauk -
(65) Yebyu 362/19
(66) Nyin Htway 365/13
(67) Maung Mei Shaung 368/?
(68) Za Har 371/0
(69) Dawei 373/12

Hpa-An Branch Line 
(16) Thaton 138
(70) Lay Taing 141/20 (Spur Line to Tyre Plant)(71) Du Yin Seik 145/6Don Tha Mi River Bridge(72) Myaing Ka Lay (Hpa-An) 160/14

Division 9 Hinthada

Mileage 147.00 Miles 
Rail Track 191.70 Miles 
Bridges 236 Bridges 
Stations 42 Stations
Kyangin-Hinthada-Pathein Line
(1) Kyangin 174 1/4 Spur Line to Limestone Quarry -
(2) Myan Aung 169
(3) San Ni Chaung 164 1/4
(4) Te Gyi Kone 161 1/4
(5) Tha Yet Kone 158
(6) In Pin 153 1/2
(7) Ka Nyin Ngu 150 1/4
(8) Ta Bye Gwin -
(9) Htu Gyi 145 Spur Line to Mt.Tha Pyay Pin Quarry(10) Me Za Li Gon 138 3/4
(11) Zaung Dan 135 1/2
(12) Ingabu 132 1/2
(13) Ta Bin Gon 128Myo Kwin Bridge No.48(14) Myo Kwin 125 1/2
(15) Dan Bi 122 1/2
(16) Ywa Thar 119 1/2
(17) Hpa Ya Kone 116 3/4
(18) Tar Gwa 113
(19) Hinthada 109 1/2 (miles from Yangon) <--Ferry--> Tharawaw 100 3/4 (Division 6)
(20) Nat Maw -
(21) Neik Ban 120
(22) Yon Tha Lin 124 1/4
(23) Ka Mauk Su 127 1/2
(24) Daik Pyet 131
(25) Za Yat Hla 136 1/4
(26) Ze Kone 138 3/4
(27) Ye Gyi 142 1/4
(28) Kwin Gyi 147 1/2
(29) Ah Thok 153
(30) Yo Da Ya Det 157 1/2
(31) Hle Seik 161
(32) Gon Min 166
(33) Apin Hni Hse (Milestone 20) -
(34) Dar Ka 170 3/4
(35) Kwin Yar 174
(36) Be Ga Yet 177 1/2
(37) Khon Zin Kone 180 1/2
(38) Ta Kone Gyi 183 3/4
(39) Koe Su 187
(40) Myat Toe 189
(41) Shwe Wut Hmoe -
(42) Pathein 191 3/4

Division 10 Pakokku

Mileague 240.47 Miles
Railway Track 274.04 Miles 
Bridges 1026 bridges 
Stations 65 Stations
Ma Gyi Bok - (Division 2)
Taw Gyaung Gyi 454 3/4

Pakokku-Kalay LineSin Phyu Shin Bridge (Chindwin River) 
(1) Auk Oh 457 Spur Line to (2) Min Ywa 455/23
(3) Ma Au 460 1/2
(4) War Yar 76-Ywa 462
(5) Ye Sa Gyo 467
(6) Taung Oh 471 1/2
(7) Pa Khan Gyi 474 3/4
(8) Si Thar 477 1/2
(9) Kyauk Hle Ga 482
(10) Pa Daing Chon 484
(11) Kyee Ywa 486
(12) Pakokku 489 Spur Line to (13) Shwe Tan Tit
(14) Hpone Kan 492 1/4
(15) Kyauk Hpu 499 1/4
(16) War Kan 502 1/2
(17) Paik Thin 507
(18) Daung Oh 513 3/4
(19) Myaing 516 1/4
(20) Myo Soe 523 1/2
(21) Taung Yoe 526 3/4
(22) Te Gyi 530 1/4
(23) Kan Thit 533
(24) Hpa Lan Kaing 536 3/4
(25) Thit Kyi Taw 539 1/4
(26) Wun Tin 544 1/2
(27) Dat Taw 547
(28) Nyaung Yin 549 1/4
(29) Zee Pyar 551
(30) Min Kaing 553
(31) Gaung Paung 560
(32) Kyauk Ka Sin 562/21
(33) Kyaw Thar 565 1/2
(34) Tha Yet Chin Lwin Hto 570 1/2
(35) War Pin 576 1/4
(36) Kyet Yoe 578 1/2
(37) Zan Hmway 580 1/2
(38) Kyaw 582 1/2Railroad underconstruction 

(39) Yae Myet Ni 595 3/4
(40) Nyaung Lel 599
(41) Gaung Ton 603
(42) Me 607 3/4
(43) Lel Ma 612 3/4
(44) Pyit Ma 614 3/4
(45) Gan Gaw 618 1/4
(46) Lar Boet 623
(47) Myin Zar 627
(48) Let Pan 632
(49) Kan 639 1/4
(50) Mwayt Lel 644 3/4
(51) Ye Hla -
(52) Hnan Khar 650 1/2
(53) Taung Khin Yan 655 1/4
(54) Myauk Khin Yan 658 1/2
(55) Koke Kar -
(56) Han Thar Wa Di (Chin) 663 1/4
(57) Man Taw 668 3/4
(58) Se Taw 674 1/4
(59) Si Haung 678 1/4
(60) Than Bo 680 1/2
(61) He Loke 683 3/4
(62) Nat Chaung 687 3/4
(63) Htauk Kyant 693 1/2
(64) Hto Mar 695 1/2
(65) Thar Si Le 697 1/2
(66) Kalay 701 1/2

Division 11 Bagan

Mileague 371.41 Miles
Railway Track 435.88 Miles
Bridges 1,283 Bridges
Stations 81 Stations (91 stations shown on map)

Min Kan 175/0 (Division 6)

Aunglan Line opened 1999(1) Da Yin Da Bo 175/12
(2) Pya Loet 183
(3) Bwet Kyi 190
(4) Htauk Kyant Taing 191 1/2
(5) Than Ywa 193 1/2
(6) Aung Lan 198 1/2
(7) Moe Kaung 203 1/2
(8) Zaung Lya Chin 207 1/4
(9) Tha Ya Gon 209 3/4
(10) Aye Ka Rit -
(11) Gway Cho 218
(12) Hlay Wun 223
(13) Hpo Sut -
(14) Koe Pin 229 1/4
(15) Thet Kei Kyin 234 3/4
(16) Pa Yet Kye 239 1/2
(17) Wet Ka The 244
(18) Sat Thwar Junction (at 248/11)

Da Lant Chun 261 1/2 (Division 5)

Taungdwingyi-Bagan Line
(19) Oe Pauk 266 3/4
(20) Ku Lar Ma 270 1/2
(21) Koke Ko Kone 273 1/2
(22) Taung Lyaung 278 1/2
(18) Sat Thwar 282 3/4 (Junction to Aunglan-Pyay)
(23) Chaung Net 285 1/2
(24) Taung Dwin Gyi 292 (Junction to Magway)
(25) Sa Don Chaung 296 1/4
(26) Sa Don Gon Kyi -
(27) Myo Lu Lin 301 1/2
(28) Myo Thit 307 3/4
(29) Shwe Pan Pin 312 3/4
(30) Nat Mauk 317
(31) Let Khoke Pin 320 1/4
(32) Lay Ein 325 1/4
(33) Thar Hmya 334 1/4
(34) Gway Kone 338 1/4
(35) Sin Thay Kan 342
(36) Pin Chaung 346
(37) Nyaung Hto 352 3/4
(38) In Taw Kyei 356 3/4
(39) Kyauk Pa Daung 363 1/2 (Junction to Kyee Ni)
(40) Kan Tha Yar 368 3/4
(41) Nga Min May 375
(42) Su Ti 380
(43) Taung Zin 383 1/2
(44) Shin Mein 389 1/4
(45) Bagan 393 1/4
(46) Pu Lin 398 3/4
(47) Thit Htaunt 403
(48) Hpet Tan 405 3/4
(49) Let Htoke 408 1/4
(50) Nyaung Hla 409
(51) Kyaw Zi 414 1/2
(52) Kyar Poet Kan Daw 415 3/4
(53) Ta Maik Tha 417 1/4
(54) Kan Ywa 419/21-22
(55) Ta Pin Kan 422 1/4
(56) Nyaung Kan 424 1/4
(57) Sar Khar Junction (at 428/4)

Taw Ma 316 3/4 (Division 4) 

Meiktila-Myingyan Line
319/12
(58) Meik Ti La 320
(59) In Gyin Su 325 1/4
(60) Yae Cho 330 1/2
(61) Tha But Kone 335
(62) Ma Hlaing 341 3/4
(63) Yae Zin 342 1/2
(64) Pan Aing 345
(65) Yon Sin Gyi 350 1/4
(66) Aung Thar 356 3/4
(67) Taung Tha 361 3/4
(68) Chon Gyi 364 3/4
(69) Hpa Yar Hla 366
(70) Hpet Taw 368
(57) Sar Khar 371 3/4 Junction to Bagan(71) Myin Gyan 375/18
376/12

Kin Ma Gan - (Division 3)

Kyaukpadaung-Kyeeni Branch Line
(39) Kyauk Pa Daung 363 1/2
(72) Twin Hpyu 367 1/2
(73) Than Chay Kan -
(74) Gway Jo 373 1/4
(75) Dan Ywa 379 1/2
(76) Kyee Ni 387 1/4

Taungdwingyi-Magway Line
(24) Taung Dwin Gyi 292
(77) Hin Ga Yaw -
(78) Bi Tha Noe 301/12-13
(79) Pya Tu 305/5-6
(80) Jau Pyi Kone (Quarry) -
(81) Yin Nar Thar Si 308/11-12
(82) Myin Sain 310/21-22
(83) Than Pin San 314/10-11
(84) Kan Ni Le 316/21-22
(85) Nga Na Po Lan Gway 321/22-23
(86) Shar Saung Kan 326/24
(87) Tha Yet Lay Pin 330/12-13
(88) Shar Pin Hla 332/3-4
(89) Khaung Taw U 334/2-3
(90) Pu Htoe San 338
(91) Magway 343/17 Branch Line to KanbyaMagway-Kanbya Line 8 miles completed 2011'' 
(91) Magway 343/17
(--) TTC -
(--) University of Medicine -
(--) Kanbya -

Proposed

See also
 Myanmar Railways
 Rail transport in Burma
 History of rail transport in Myanmar
 Yangon Circular Railway
 Railway stations in South East Asia for standard gauge lines

References
Myanmar Railway Maps

External links

Myanmar
Railway stations
Railway stations